Pierre Moussié (28 February 1894 – 3 March 1941) was a French sailor who represented his country at the 1928 Summer Olympics in Amsterdam, Netherlands.

Sources 
 

Sailors at the 1928 Summer Olympics – 6 Metre
Olympic sailors of France
1894 births
1941 deaths
French male sailors (sport)